Özgür Yılmaz (born 8 December 1977) is a Turkish judoka.

Achievements

References

1977 births
Living people
Turkish male judoka
21st-century Turkish people